Hsien Wu (24 November 1893 – 8 August 1959) was a Chinese biochemist and geneticist. He was the first to propose that protein denaturation was a purely conformational change, i.e., corresponded to protein unfolding and not to some chemical alteration of the protein.  This crucial idea was popularized later by Linus Pauling and Alfred Mirsky.

Wu was born in Fuzhou, Fujian, China. He studied at the Massachusetts Institute of Technology (undergraduate), and then trained at Harvard University (graduate) under Otto Folin, developing the first small-volume (≥ 0.1-mL sample) assay for blood sugar (Folin-Wu method). Wu then returned to China to a position at Peking Union Medical College, becoming head of the biochemistry department in 1924. At the end of that year, he married his research assistant Daisy Yen and would continue collaborating with her until his death in 1959.

Wu left China in 1947 to reside in the United States; his wife and children joined him in 1949.

Wu's son, Ray J. Wu, became the Liberty Hyde Bailey Professor of Molecular Genetics and Biology at Cornell University, and was active in studying transgenic plants, particularly rice.

References

Further reading
 
 
 

1893 births
1959 deaths
American biochemists
American geneticists
Biologists from Fujian
Chemists from Fujian
Chinese biochemists
Chinese Civil War refugees
Chinese emigrants to the United States
Chinese geneticists
Educators from Fujian
Harvard University alumni
Massachusetts Institute of Technology alumni
Members of Academia Sinica
Academic staff of Peking Union Medical College
People from Fuzhou
University of Alabama faculty